Alexandra Nikolayevna Stepanova (born 19 August 1995) is a Russian ice dancer. With her skating partner, Ivan Bukin, she is a four-time European medalist (silver in 2019, bronze in 2015, 2018 and 2020), the 2018 Grand Prix of Helsinki champion, the 2018 Rostelecom Cup champion, and a two-time Russian national champion (2021, 2022). In total, they have won eleven medals on the Grand Prix series and three Finlandia Trophy titles.

Earlier in their career, Stepanova/Bukin won the 2013 World Junior Championships, 2012–13 JGP Final, and 2014 Russian Junior Championships.

Personal life
Alexandra Stepanova was born on 19 August 1995 in Saint Petersburg, Russia. Her mother is a former volleyball player and her father a speed skater.

Career

Early years 
Stepanova began learning to skate in 1999. As a single skater, she struggled with jumps because of her long legs, leading her coach to redirect her into ice dancing. Since there was no dance school in Saint Petersburg, she moved to Moscow. Stepanova was partnered with Bukin in 2006 by coaches Irina Zhuk and Alexander Svinin. She had no previous partners.

2010–2011 to 2011–2012 
Stepanova/Bukin debuted on the Junior Grand Prix series in the 2010–2011 season. They won both of their events and qualified for the 2010 JGP Final, where they won the bronze medal.

Stepanova/Bukin won both of their 2011–2012 JGP events, Romania and Italy. Their placements qualified them for the JGP Final where they placed fourth in the short and second in the free dance to receive the bronze medal. They won silver at the 2012 Russian Junior Championships. Stepanova/Bukin then competed at the 2012 World Junior Championships and won the silver medal.

2012–2013 season: World Junior title 
Stepanova/Bukin won gold medals at their JGP events in Turkey and Germany, qualifying them for the JGP Final in Sochi, Russia. They won the gold medal in their third appearance at the final. Stepanova/Bukin withdrew from the 2013 Russian Junior Championships due to Bukin's cold and sinusitis. They were assigned to the 2013 World Junior Championships where they won the gold medal, more than seven points ahead of French ice dancers Gabriella Papadakis / Guillaume Cizeron. After the event, the duo and their coaches discussed whether to move up to the senior level.

2013–2014 season: Senior debut 
Stepanova/Bukin decided to make their senior debut in the 2013–2014 season. They were assigned to one Grand Prix event, the 2013 Skate Canada, and finished eighth. They came in fifth at the 2013 Winter Universiade. At the Russian Championships, Stepanova/Bukin finished sixth on the senior level and won gold on the junior level ahead of Yanovskaya/Mozgov. They were assigned to the 2014 World Junior Championships but withdrew due to illness.

2014–2015 season: European bronze 
Stepanova/Bukin began their season with a gold medal at the 2014 Finlandia Trophy, an ISU Challenger Series (CS) event. Their first Grand Prix medal, bronze, came at the 2014 Skate America. At the 2014 Rostelecom Cup, they finished fifth. Stepanova/Bukin took bronze at the 2015 Russian Championships and were assigned to the 2015 European Championships in Stockholm. They were awarded the bronze medal in Sweden, ahead of Elena Ilinykh / Ruslan Zhiganshin. They ended their season at the 2015 World Championships in Shanghai, finishing ninth.

2015–2016 season 
Stepanova/Bukin had planned to begin the 2015–2016 season at the 2015 CS Finlandia Trophy, however, they withdrew because Bukin's off-season illness had slowed their preparations for the season. At the 2015 Trophée Éric Bompard, they placed third in the short dance, which was accepted as the final result following the competition's cancellation due to the November 2015 Paris attacks. They finished fourth overall at their next Grand Prix event, the 2015 NHK Trophy. Stepanova/Bukin edged out Ilinykh/Zhiganshin for the bronze medal at the Russian Championships in late December in Ekaterinburg and finished as the third Russian team, in fifth place, in January 2016 at the European Championships in Bratislava.

Stepanova/Bukin were assigned to the 2016 World Championships in Boston after Ekaterina Bobrova / Dmitri Soloviev withdrew due to a positive doping sample. They finished eleventh in the competition after placing eleventh in both the short and free dance.

2016–2017 season 
Stepanova/Bukin started their season on the Challenger Series, at the 2016 CS Finlandia Trophy. Ranked first in both segments, they earned personal best score and won the gold medal by a margin of 7.07 points over silver medalists Madison Hubbell / Zachary Donohue. Their Grand Prix assignments were the 2016 Skate Canada International, where they placed fifth, and 2016 Cup of China, where they won the bronze medal.

In December 2016 they won the silver medal at the 2017 Russian Championships. They later competed at the 2017 European Championships, where they placed fifth, and at the 2017 World Championships where they placed tenth.

2017–2018 season: Second European bronze 
Stepanova/Bukin started their season by winning the silver medal at the 2017 CS Finlandia Trophy. They then won two bronze medals in the Grand Prix series, the first bronze came at the 2017 Rostelecom Cup and the second bronze came at the 2017 Internationaux de France. They then won the silver medal at the 2018 Russian Championships. A month later they won the bronze medal at the 2018 European Championships after placing second in the short dance and 3rd in the free dance.

They were not sent to the 2018 Winter Olympics because it was announced by the Russian Figure Skating Federation on 23 January 2018 that the International Olympic Committee did not invite Bukin to compete.

They later competed at the 2018 World Championships where they finished seventh after placing seventh in both the short dance and the free dance.

2018–2019 season: European silver 
Stepanova/Bukin started their season at the 2018 CS Finlandia Trophy where they won the gold medal with a personal best score of 200.78 points. This was already their third victory at the Finlandia Trophy since they had won this event also in 2014 and 2016.

In early November Stepanova/Bukin won their first Grand Prix gold medal at the 2018 Grand Prix of Helsinki. They were ranked first in both the Rhythm dance and the free dance and won the gold medal by a margin of about 4 points over the silver medalists, Charlène Guignard / Marco Fabbri. Two weeks later they won their second Grand Prix gold medal at the 2018 Rostelecom Cup. They were ranked first in both programs and beat the silver medalists, Sara Hurtado / Kirill Khaliavin by about 25 points. With two Grand Prix gold medals they qualified for the 2018–19 Grand Prix Final, where they finished fourth.

At the 2019 Russian Championships, Stepanova/Bukin placed second in both programs, taking their third consecutive silver medal, behind Victoria Sinitsina / Nikita Katsalapov, who had also finished ahead of them at the Grand Prix Final.  Reflecting afterward, Stepanova said "we didn’t skate without mistakes at nationals and we know what we have to work on.  There is nothing we can leave out. We have to work on everything—on technique, emotions and our mistakes, every day. You need to skate perfectly."

Competing next at the 2019 European Championships, Stepanova/Bukin placed second in the rhythm dance, behind Papadakis/Cizeron, earning their best score to date on the Tango Romantica pattern dance and capitalizing on serious errors by rivals Sinitsina/Katsalapov.  They placed second in the free dance as well, winning the silver medal overall.  Bukin called it "a big step forward for us."  Stepanova/Bukin concluded the season at the 2019 World Championships, where they placed third in the rhythm dance, winning a small bronze medal, but dropped to fourth place after the free dance.  Stepanova pronounced them "ready to fight for the top three in the world."

2019–2020 season: Third European bronze 
Having skipped the Challenger series due to Stepanova recovering from a back injury, they began the season at 2019 Skate America.  They placed second in the short program.  They narrowly won the free dance over gold medalists Madison Hubbell / Zachary Donohue, taking silver overall.  Stepanova said she was "more pleased with our performance than yesterday."  They won a second silver medal at the 2019 NHK Trophy, qualifying to their second Grand Prix Final.  They placed fourth at the Final for the second year, notably placing ahead of domestic rivals Sinitsina/Katsalapov.

Competing at the 2020 Russian Championships, Stepanova/Bukin were second in the rhythm dance.  They placed first in the free dance, but remained in second place overall behind Sinitsina/Katsalapov.  Stepanova remarked "we’re happy with what we did."

In January, Stepanova/Bukin competed at the 2020 European Championships in Graz, Austria. They placed fourth in the rhythm dance and third in the free dance, taking their fourth European medal, a bronze, behind Russian teammates Sinitsina/Katsalapov and Papadakis/Cizeron of France.  They had been assigned to compete at the World Championships in Montreal, but these were cancelled as a result of the coronavirus pandemic.

2020–2021 season: First national title 
Stepanova suffered from a reoccurrence of a back injury and sought treatment in Germany, as a result of which the team missed the 2020 Russian senior test skates.  They were scheduled to compete on the Grand Prix at the 2020 Rostelecom Cup, but withdrew due to a COVID-19 outbreak at their training centre.  It was subsequently reported that both had caught the virus in succession, leaving them only three weeks to prepare for the national championships.

With rivals Sinitsina/Katsalapov withdrawing from the 2021 Russian Championships due to contracting COVID-19 as well, Stepanova/Bukin entered the event as the heavy favourites to finally take the title.  They won the rhythm dance by 3.26 points over Zahorski/Guerreiro.  They won the free dance as well by a 5.96 point margin, taking the gold medal for the first time at the Russian Championships.  Stepanova said afterward "there was not much time for the preparation and we were nervous. We didn't want to skate worse than we did last year."  While the European Championships were already cancelled due to the pandemic, they were assigned to the Russian team for the 2021 World Championships in Stockholm.

Following the national championships, Stepanova/Bukin participated in the 2021 Channel One Trophy, a televised team competition held in lieu of the cancelled European Championships.  They were selected for the Time of Firsts team captained by Evgenia Medvedeva.  They placed first in both their segments of the competition, while their team finished in second overall.  They did not participate in the Russian Cup Final.

Four-time and defending World champions Papadakis/Cizeron declined to compete at the World Championships in Stockholm, seeming to invite a major contest between six teams, Stepanova/Bukin among them, to make the podium.  They placed fifth in the rhythm dance, 0.35 behind Canadians Gilles/Poirier in fourth, after making errors in their steps. They were fifth in the free dance as well, holding fifth place overall.  Stepanova called the rhythm dance mistakes "a huge lesson for us." Their placement combined with Sinitsina/Katsalapov's gold medal qualified three berths for Russian dance teams at the 2022 Winter Olympics.

2021–2022 season: Beijing Olympics 
Stepanova and Bukin did not appear at the Russian test skates, citing medical reasons. They were scheduled to make their debut at the 2021 CS Finlandia Trophy, but withdrew days beforehand, with their coach citing a need for additional preparation time.

Stepanova/Bukin were initially assigned to the 2021 Cup of China as their first Grand Prix event, but following its cancellation they were reassigned to the 2021 Gran Premio d'Italia. Third in both segments, they won the bronze medal. They said afterward that they felt lacking in confidence heading into the event. They won a bronze medal as well at their second event, the 2021 Internationaux de France, with Bukin saying that they had "made a little step forward since our first Grand Prix in Italy and we are more satisfied with what we did here."

At the 2022 Russian Championships, Stepanova/Bukin were second in the rhythm dance behind Sinitsina/Katsalapov. After the latter withdrew for health reasons, Stepanova/Bukin easily won their second consecutive national title. Bukin said "something incredible, beautiful, it was really pleasant." They went on to win the silver medal at the 2022 European Championships. On January 20, they were officially named to the Russian Olympic team. 

Competing at the 2022 Winter Olympics, Stepanova/Bukin placed fifth in the rhythm dance in the dance event. In the free dance, they botched the choreographic slide at he end of the program, finishing eighth in that segment and dropping to sixth overall.

Programs 
(with Bukin)

Records and achievements 
(with Bukin)
 
 Set the ice dancing world record of the new +5 / -5 GOE (Grade of Execution) system for the combined total (200.78 points), rhythm dance (79.16 points) and free dance (121.62 points) at the 2018 CS Finlandia Trophy.
 They became the first team to score above 200 points at the 2018 CS Finlandia Trophy.
 Set the ice dancing world record for the free dance (124.94 points) at the 2018 Rostelecom Cup.

Competitive highlights 
GP: Grand Prix; CS: Challenger Series; JGP: Junior Grand Prix

 With Bukin

Detailed results 
Small medals for short and free programs awarded only at ISU Championships. At team events, medals awarded for team results only.

Senior

Junior

References

External links 

 
 

! colspan="3" style="border-top: 5px solid #78FF78;" | World Record Holders

Russian female ice dancers
European Figure Skating Championships medalists
World Junior Figure Skating Championships medalists
1995 births
Living people
Figure skaters from Saint Petersburg
Competitors at the 2013 Winter Universiade
Figure skaters at the 2022 Winter Olympics
Olympic figure skaters of Russia